Steve Reich: Works 1965–1995 is a 1997 10-CD box set of compositions by composer Steve Reich released by Nonesuch Records as part of Reich's 60th birthday celebration. Described as, "monumental... essential... beautiful", it includes full track and personnel listing, career chronology, appreciative notes (such as essays by John Adams and Michael Tilson Thomas), a new interview, and "his most famous works" with the "curious exclusions" of Violin Phase, Music for Pieces of Wood and Vermont Counterpoint.

Track listing
Disc 1
Come Out
Piano Phase
It's Gonna Rain
Four Organs (new recording)
Disc 2
Drumming
Disc 3
Music for Mallet Instruments, Voices and Organ
Clapping Music
Six Marimbas
Disc 4
Music for 18 Musicians (new recording)
Disc 5
Eight Lines (new recording)
Tehillim (1994, conducted by Reinbert de Leeuw)
Disc 6
The Desert Music
Disc 7
New York Counterpoint (new recording)
Sextet
Four Sections
Disc 8
Different Trains
Electric Counterpoint
Three Movements
Disc 9
Excerpts from The Cave
Disc 10
Proverb
Nagoya Marimbas
City Life

Sources

1997 classical albums
1997 compilation albums
Steve Reich albums
Nonesuch Records compilation albums